Kavita Lorenz (born 5 September 1995) is a German former competitive ice dancer. With her skating partner, Joti Polizoakis, she is a three-time German national champion (2016–2018) and has competed in the final segment at four ISU Championships.

Personal life 
Lorenz was born on 5 September 1995 in Berlin.

Career 
Lorenz began learning to skate in 2000. As a single skater, she was coached by Michael Huth in Oberstdorf. She placed 9th at the 2010 German Junior Championships and 11th at the 2011 German Championships.

In 2012, Lorenz teamed up with Ukraine's Yevhen Kholoniuk to compete in ice dancing. They won the bronze medal at the 2013 German Championships.

Partnership with Polizoakis 
In the spring of 2015, Lorenz teamed up with Joti Polizoakis, whom she had known for many years. They were coached by Igor Shpilband and Martin Skotnický in Novi, Michigan.

Making their international debut, Lorenz/Polizoakis finished fourth at the 2015 Nebelhorn Trophy, a Challenger Series (CS) event. They placed fifth at the 2015 Ondrej Nepela Trophy (CS), first at the 2015 Open d'Andorra, and fifth at the 2015 Warsaw Cup (CS). In December, they won the German national title ahead of Katharina Müller / Tim Dieck and were selected to represent Germany at the 2016 European Championships in Bratislava, Slovakia. At Europeans in January, Lorenz/Polizoakis placed 13th in the short dance to qualify for the free, where they ranked 15th, resulting in a final placement of 14th at their first ISU Championship. In March, they qualified for the final segment at the 2016 World Championships in Boston by placing 18th in the short dance and went on to finish 17th overall. They ended their partnership in April 2016, but announced in June that they would continue skating together. Lorenz announced her competitive retirement on 10 May 2018.

Programs 
(with Polizoakis)

Competitive highlights 
GP: Grand Prix; CS: Challenger Series

With Polizoakis

With Kholoniuk

Single skating

References

External links 

 

1995 births
German female ice dancers
Living people
Figure skaters from Berlin
Figure skaters at the 2018 Winter Olympics
Olympic figure skaters of Germany